Yoni Chen (August 10, 1953 – June 27, 1995) was an Israeli actor, voice actor, director and puppeteer.

Biography
Chen was born in Israel to a Syrian Jewish family. When he was two years old, he and his family had lived in Cuba for five years. After reaching adolescence, Chen attended the Thelma Yellin High School in Givatayim to study drama, then he worked for the Israel Defense Forces. He began his career in 1978 performing on stage at the Cameri Theatre and the Orna Porat Children's Theatre. That same year, he made his debut film appearance in The Band and appeared in other films over the next several years such as Dizengoff 99.

Among Chen's most popular roles was on the children's puppet show Parpar Nechmad, in which he performed the character Batz the Turtle.

As a voice actor, Chen was heavily involved in the Hebrew language dubbing of Looney Tunes. He performed the Hebrew voices of Sylvester, The Tasmanian Devil and Elmer Fudd. Other roles Chen performed included Morten, Gusta and Gorgo in The Wonderful Adventures of Nils, Tin Man in The Wonderful Wizard of Oz, Yogi Bear in The Yogi Bear Show, all characters in Tip en Tap, several characters in The Smurfs and many more. Chen also founded a dubbing company which was then later acquired by Elrom Studios after his death.

Personal life
Chen was openly gay. His partner, Ari worked for Israeli Educational Television.

Death
On June 27, 1995, Chen died after suffering from AIDS for some time. He was nearing his 42nd birthday. Parpar Nechmad underwent a hiatus for a while and eventually, the role of Batz was passed on to Ami Weinberg.

References

External links

1953 births
1995 deaths
AIDS-related deaths in Israel
Israeli male film actors
Israeli male stage actors
Israeli male television actors
Israeli male voice actors
Israeli people of Syrian-Jewish descent
Israeli puppeteers
Israeli voice directors
Jewish Israeli male actors
Israeli gay actors
LGBT puppeteers
Gay Jews 
20th-century Israeli Jews
Male actors from Tel Aviv
Thelma Yellin High School of Arts alumni
20th-century Israeli male actors
20th-century Israeli LGBT people